Speiredonia cthulhui is a species of moth of the family Erebidae first described by Alberto Zilli and Jeremy D. Holloway in 2005. It is found on New Guinea.

The length of the forewings is 26.5 mm for males and 25.5 mm for females.

It is named after the Cthulhu, a fictional creature created by author H. P. Lovecraft.

References

Moths described in 2005
Speiredonia